Shea Whigham (born January 5, 1969) is an American actor best known for portraying Elias "Eli" Thompson in the drama series Boardwalk Empire. He also appeared in the first season of True Detective and the third season of Fargo and in numerous films, including Take Shelter, Silver Linings Playbook, American Hustle, The Wolf of Wall Street, Kong: Skull Island, First Man, Vice, and Joker. He has appeared as Agent Michael Stasiak in Fast & Furious, Fast & Furious 6, and F9.

Early life
Whigham was born in Tallahassee, Florida, the son of attorney Frank and school librarian Beth. The family moved to Lake Mary, Florida, when Whigham was five years old. He attended Tyler Junior College in Tyler, Texas, and then transferred to the State University of New York at Purchase, New York, where he was part of a small acting program with only 31 students and a graduating class of eight seniors. After graduating, he co-founded the theatre troupe the Rorschach Group with his college roommate Kirk Acevedo in New York City and served as an actor and artistic director with the troupe for three years.

Career
Whigham appeared in one 1997 episode of the television series Ghost Stories before he received a starring role in the 2000 film Tigerland. He went on to appear in the television films Submerged, R.U.S./H., and Paradise before acting in the 2003 film All the Real Girls. Between 2004 and 2006, he appeared in the Japanese film Out of This World, the drama television series Medical Investigation, and the films Water, Man of the House, Faith of My Fathers, Lords of Dogtown, Psychic Driving, and South of Heaven.

Whigham appeared in Pride and Glory and co-starred in the horror film Splinter, the thriller Creek, and the science fiction film Radio Free Albemuth.

He had a regular leading role on the HBO series Boardwalk Empire as Elias "Eli" Thompson, sheriff of Atlantic County, New Jersey, for the show's entire run. In 2014, he appeared in the HBO series True Detective as the disillusioned former minister Joel Theriot. He appeared in two episodes of FX's Justified in 2015.

Between 2012 and 2017 he had several movie roles, such as The Wolf of Wall Street, American Hustle, Silver Linings Playbook, Term Life, and Kong: Skull Island. In 2018, he appeared in the films Sicario: Day of the Soldado, First Man, and Bad Times at the El Royale. In 2019 he appeared in the Warner Bros./DC Comics psychological thriller Joker as GCPD Detective Burke. He also appeared in both seasons of HBO's Vice Principals as Ray Liptrapp; appeared in Fargo and the miniseries Waco; and he starred in the television series Homecoming alongside Julia Roberts for which he was nominated for a Critics' Choice Television Award for Best Supporting Actor in a Drama Series. In 2020 he was cast as Pete Strickland on HBO's reimagining of Perry Mason, a role for which he received attention for his moustache.

He has appeared in several projects alongside actors Michael Shannon and Paul Sparks, both of whom starred on Boardwalk Empire and Waco. Shannon and Whigham also appeared together in The Quarry, Take Shelter, Tigerland and Bad Lieutenant: Port of Call New Orleans.

Personal life
Whigham has four children, including actress Giorgia Whigham, with his wife Christine Whigham.

Filmography

Film

Television

Video games

References

External links

1969 births
Living people
American male film actors
American male television actors
Male actors from Tallahassee, Florida
State University of New York at Purchase alumni
20th-century American male actors
21st-century American male actors
Outstanding Performance by a Cast in a Motion Picture Screen Actors Guild Award winners
People from Lake Mary, Florida